Thomas Walker (c. 1664–1748), of Wimbledon, Surrey, was a British Whig politician who sat in the House of Commons between 1733 and 1747.

Walker was probably the son of Edward Walker of St  Sepulchre's, London, and his wife Susanna Winchurst. He became immensely wealthy, probably as a money lender.

In November 1714, Walker was appointed Commissioner of Customs. He changed the post for that of  Surveyor General of crown lands in October 1731, as the latter post did not disqualify  him from sitting in the House of Commons. He went first into Parliament  at the age of 69. He was  returned unopposed as Member of Parliament for West Looe as a government nominee at a by-election on 26 January 1733. He made his only known speech in 1733, when as a former commissioner of customs he defended the then commissioners against attacks on them by the Opposition. He did not stand at the 1734 British general election but  was returned unopposed as MP for Plympton Erle at a by-election on 21 February 1735. At the 1741 British general election he was returned unopposed as MP for Helston. He did not stand in  1747.

Walker bought the Old Park estate in Wimbledon in 1738 and probably lived at Westside House. He died  unmarried on 22 October 1748, aged 84 and was buried in the churchyard of St Mary's Wimbledon.  Horace Walpole called him "a kind of toad-eater to Sir Robert Walpole and Lord Godolphin". He went frequently to the races at Newmarket, and was considered a notorious usurer.

References

1660s births
1748 deaths
Members of the Parliament of Great Britain for constituencies in Cornwall
British MPs 1727–1734
British MPs 1734–1741
British MPs 1741–1747
Members of the Parliament of Great Britain for Plympton Erle